NIDEC-SHIMPO America Corporation is the North American subsidiary of Japan-based NIDEC-SHIMPO Corporation. NIDEC-SHIMPO is a leading global manufacturer of high precision gearing technologies, including planetary, worm, hypoid, bevel, strain wave and cycloidal gears.

Affiliated Companies

NIDEC Corporation 
With annual sales exceeding $15 Billion for the fiscal year 2022, the NIDEC Corporation (NYSE:NJ) is a provider of small, mid-size motors and related drive technologies. Founded in 1973 by current Chairman of the Board and CEO, Shigenobu Nagamori, the NIDEC Corporation has a portfolio of motors for hard disk drives and for fans used in consumer appliances or automotive applications. The NIDEC Group consists of more than 150 corporate subsidiaries around the globe. The group totals more than 100,000 employees that are supplying products and services to customers in more than 30 countries. The NIDEC Group companies can be categorized into the following business segments: Motors, Machinery, Optical & Electronic Components, Other (Services & logistics).

NIDEC America Corporation 
The U.S. subsidiary of NIDEC Corporation with offices in Massachusetts, Connecticut, California, Colorado and Minnesota. NIDEC America Corporation consist of technologies to meet the thermal management and motion control needs of the world's designers and manufactures of IT, business equipment, automotive, industrial, and consumer electronic products.

NIDEC-SHIMPO 
Created in 1952, SHIMPO located its corporate headquarters and main production facility in Kyoto, Japan where it remains today. NIDEC-SHIMPO is a supplier of power transmission drive technology, instrumentation and ceramics equipment to the industrial marketplace.

Nidec-Minster 
The Minster Machine Company has corporate headquarters and manufacturing plant in Minster, Ohio. The Nidec Minster Corporation is a supplier of equipment and services for the material forming industry. Minster provides mechanical power presses; feeds; straighteners; reels; coil cars; die transfer tables; press controls; training programs; production monitoring systems; inspection services; preventative maintenance services; remanufacturing services; technical consulting services; press relocation services and other products and programs designed specifically for the material forming market. Today, Nidec-Minster presses and material handling equipment are in production in more than 84 countries around the world.

Nidec Minster is the global headquarters for Nidec Press & Automation. Nidec Press & Automation brands include: Minster, Arisa, Kyori, Vamco, CHS & SYS.

History

References

External links 
NIDEC Corporation
NIDEC America Corporation
NIDEC-SHIMPO Corporation
NIDEC-Minster
NIDEC-SHIMPO (ZHEJIANG) Corporation
Nidec-Shimpo America Corporation
Shimpo Instruments
Shimpo Drives
Shimpo Ceramics

Itasca, Illinois
Companies based in DuPage County, Illinois
Ceramics manufacturers of the United States
Instrument-making corporations